The Sport Performance Aviation Panther is a single seat, all-metal, homebuilt aircraft under development by Sport Performance Aviation of Green Cove Springs, Florida. The aircraft is intended to be supplied as plans and as a kit for amateur construction.

Design
The Panther is a single seat, low wing aircraft, built of aluminum with a bubble canopy. The forward fuselage is constructed from welded 4130 steel tubing, with the aft fuselage, tail and wings made from 2024-T3 aluminum sheet. The landing gear can be assembled in either tricycle or conventional gear arrangements. The wings are designed to be folded for storage or ground transport.

Variants
Two variants are available, a Light Sport and a standard category.

Panther Sport
 wing span, Engines from 100-160hp with a  gross weight,  of fuel.

Panther LSA
 wing span, Engine options from 100-130hp,   of fuel. Meets performance requirements for the US light-sport aircraft category.

Specifications (Panther LSA)

See also

References

External links
 

Homebuilt aircraft